Allein unter Schatten is the third full-length album of Mondsucht.

Track listing
"Herbstabend"– 2:31
"Never Again"– 3:53
"Gier"– 3:41
"Schattenwelt"– 3:39
"Nichts"– 3:43
"Demon Lover"– 4:10
"RIP"– 3:12
"Im Schatten"– 5:00
"Alles für Dich"– 4:40
"Immer Fort"- 3:54
"Weißes Licht"– 4:35
"Süße Wonne"-4:26
"Waterfalls"-3:06
"Alles Für Dich 2004"-5:02
"Schwarzes Herz 2004"-4:22

Info
 All tracks written and produced by Mondsucht
 Male vocals by Robert N.
 Female vocals by Astrid M.

External links
 Mondsucht Discography Info

2004 albums
Mondsucht albums
Alice In... albums